Wilkes-Barre Academy was a private school in Wilkes-Barre, Pennsylvania, established in 1807. The school had numerous prominent alumni including several politicians.

History
An old courthouse building was used before it became Wyoming Academy and a new brick building constructed. Female students occupied two rooms in the school's building before the Girl's Institute was established.

In 1838, the school became Wyoming Academy.

Miner-Hillard Milling Company was a major business in the area. Many students came to the school from outside the immediate area.

Alumni
Benjamin Alden Bidlack, politician
Lord Butler, leader in the Pennsylvania militia and one term member of the Pennsylvania Legislature
George Catlin, artist
George Denison, U.S. Representative
Laning Harvey (1882-1942), Pennsylvania state senator
Ovid F. Johnson, attorney general
Charles Abbott Miner (1830 - 1903), state representative
Henry Pettebone, lawyer, judge, and political appointee
George Washington Woodward, U.S. Congressman
Hendrick B. Wright, state politician

References

1807 establishments in Pennsylvania
Buildings and structures in Wilkes-Barre, Pennsylvania
Defunct private schools in the United States
Private schools in Pennsylvania